is a Fijian rugby union player who plays as a centre. He represented the Sunwolves in the 2016 Super Rugby season. He also represented the Fijian Drua in the 2017 National Rugby Championship

References

1988 births
Living people
Fijian rugby union players
Rugby union centres
Sunwolves players
Fijian Drua players